NGC 28 is an elliptical galaxy located in the Phoenix constellation. It was discovered on 28 October 1834 by John Herschel.

References

External links
 
 

Galaxies discovered in 1834
0028
Elliptical galaxies
Phoenix (constellation)
18341028